Abichites is ceratitid genus, assigned to the family Dzhulfitidae, from the Upper Permian of Armenia, Azerbaijan, and Iran, with three species recognized: A. abichi, A. mojsisovicsi, and A. stoyanowi (the type).

Abichites is based on Kashmirites, a genus of the Lower Triassic with a strongly ribbed, commonly tuberculate, evolute shell. included in the Xenoceltitidae (Tozer, 1994). Both genera are included in the superfamily Xenodiscaceae.

References

 Arkel et al. 1957. Mesozoic Ammonoidea. Treatise on Invertebrate Paleontology Part L, Geological Society of America and University of Kansas Press.

Ceratitida genera
Permian animals of Asia
Xenodiscoidea
Permian cephalopods